San Diego Boca FC is an American soccer team based in San Diego, California, United States. Founded in 2009, the team played in National Premier Soccer League (NPSL), a national amateur league at the fourth tier of the American Soccer Pyramid, in the Northwest Division. In 2014, the club is renamed FC Force and dissolved at the end of the season.

Their stadiums were Balboa Stadium and Torero Stadium.

The San Diego Derby is an annual contest that developed between the San Diego Boca and their crosstown rivals San Diego Flash.

External links
 San Diego Boca FC (2012), National Premier Soccer League

Boca
National Premier Soccer League teams
Association football clubs established in 2009
Association football clubs disestablished in 2014
2009 establishments in California
2014 disestablishments in California